Agut is a surname. Notable people with the surname include:

José Agut (born 1961), Spanish field hockey player
Philippe Agut (1929–1988), French cyclist
Roberto Bautista Agut (born 1988), Spanish tennis player

See also
Aguts, a commune in Tarn, Occitanie, France